Aq Qayeh (also Romanized as Āq Qāyeh) is a village in Soltanali Rural District, in the Central District of Gonbad-e Qabus County, Golestan Province, Iran. At the 2006 census, its population was 5,114, in 1,157 families.

References 

Populated places in Gonbad-e Kavus County